The 1954 Montana Grizzlies football team represented the University of Montana in the 1954 college football season as a member of the Skyline Conference. The Grizzlies were led by third-year head coach Ed Chinske, played their home games at Dornblaser Field and finished the season with a record of three wins and six losses (3–6, 1–5 MSC).

Schedule

References

Montana
Montana Grizzlies football seasons
Montana Grizzlies football